Sayyid Ahmedullah Qadri ( 9 August 1909 – 5 October 1985), known as Lisan-ul-Mulk, was a writer, author, critic, editor-in-chief, Indian independence activist, Indian politician and an acclaimed figure of Hyderabad, India. He was president of Lutfuddaulah Oriental Research Institute Hyderabad, president of Hyderabad Journalist Association, member of State Library Council.

Qadri was awarded civilian award Padma Shri in 1966 by the government of India for his work in literature and education. He was also a member of Andhra Pradesh State Legislative Council and chairman of Andhra Pradesh state Hajj Committee. Further he was founder and editor-in-chief of the Urdu daily newspaper Saltanat and Paisa Akhbar;  prior to that he was editor in Tarikh Publications, which was founded by his father since 1929.

Early life

Qadri was born in Hyderabad State on 9 August 1909 to Shamsullah Qadri and Mahboob Begum Qadri in an academic family that was well known in literary circles. He was the eldest son. He had two younger brothers Imdadullah Qadri and Saadullah Qadri. His father was an author. and was the First Researcher of Deccaniyat

In 1946, Qadri was the first Journalist of Hyderabad State to write in favor of one nation theory in Urdu News Daily Saltanat.

Works 
 Muhamid e Osman  
 Tanqid-i-Qamus-ul-Mashahir : 1934 
 Mir Hasan Dehelvi : 1931
 Qamus-ul-Mashahir : 1933
 Naveed e Massarat : 1934 
 Usman-Namah : Literary and historical miscellany 16 May 1934
 Mazamir (Kalaam-e-Majmua): 1935
 Memoirs of Chand Bibi: The Princess of Ahmadnagar 1939 
 Savaneh chand Bibi  
 Azeem mujahid e Azadi Pandit Jawaharlal Nehru 1942
 Fateh Azadi 1947 
 Hind Nama : 15 August 1949 
 Jawahar Nama 1950
 Hyderabad Nama 1953
 Andhra Nama : 24 October 1958 
 Nazr-e-Aqeedat 1966
 Bahadur Nama : a humble tribute in 62 stanzas to Shri Lal Bahadur Shastri, March 1965.
 Tarana-e-Iqhlaas : a humble tribute in 52 stanzas 1968 
 Muguam-e-Ghalib : 1969  
 Paayam e Gandhi ( Message of Gandhi ) 100 stanzas 24 December 1969 released by Khan Abdul Ghaffar Khan.
 Indira Nama 1970
 Priyadarshini Gatha 1971
 Indira Sumanjali 1972
 Qisa e Sanjan 1973
 25 years of India's progress 1973

See also
 List of Indian writers

References 

Writers from Hyderabad, India
1909 births
1985 deaths
Members of the Andhra Pradesh Legislative Council
Recipients of the Padma Shri in literature & education
Urdu-language poets from India
20th-century Indian writers
Politicians from Hyderabad, India
20th-century Indian male writers
Qadiri order